The 1972 NCAA Skiing Championships were contested in Winter Park, Colorado at the nineteenth annual NCAA-sanctioned ski tournament to determine the individual and team national champions of men's collegiate alpine, cross country skiing, and ski jumping in the United States.

Host Colorado, coached by alumnus Bill Marolt, captured their third national championship (and first since 1960), finishing 5.2 points ahead of three-time defending champion Denver in the team standings.

Colorado's Mike Porcarelli reclaimed the slalom and alpine titles he won two years earlier; the repeat champions were Otto Tschudi of Denver in downhill and Bruce Cunningham of New Hampshire in Nordic combined. Denver's Odd Hammernes won his second jumping title, three years after the first.

In the downhill race, Utah sophomore David Novelle was killed after he lost a ski, went off the course, and collided with a tree. As a result, the Utah team withdrew from the competition.

Venue

This year's championships were held March 16–18 in Colorado at Winter Park, west of Denver.

The nineteenth edition, these were the sixth NCAA Championships in Colorado and the third at Winter Park (1956, 1959); the others were at Crested Butte (1966) and Steamboat Springs (1968, 1969).

Team scoring

Individual events
Four events were held, which yielded seven individual titles.
Thursday: Downhill, Cross Country
Friday: Slalom
Saturday: Jumping

See also
List of NCAA skiing programs

References

NCAA Skiing Championships
NCAA Skiing Championships
NCAA Skiing Championships
NCAA Skiing Championships
NCAA Skiing Championships
NCAA Skiing Championships
NCAA Skiing Championships
Skiing in Colorado